The Juvenile and Family Court Journal is a quarterly peer-reviewed academic journal covering juvenile and family justice. It was established in 1949 as Juvenile Court Judges Journal, and was later renamed  Juvenile Justice, and later renamed again to Journal of Juvenile & Family Courts. The journal obtained its current name in 1978. It is published by Wiley and the National Council of Juvenile and Family Court Judges. The editors-in-chief are Joey Orduna Hastings, Melissa Sickmund, and Maurice Portley. According to the Journal Citation Reports, the journal has a 2020 impact factor of 0.441.

References

External links

Criminology journals
Wiley (publisher) academic journals
Publications established in 1949
Quarterly journals
English-language journals
Juvenile justice system